Category B may refer to:

 Category B Listed building (Scotland)
 Category B Prison (UK)
 Category B Bioterrorism agent
 Category B services (Canadian television)
 A category of driving licence in the European Economic Area
 A category of driving licence in the United Kingdom
 An intermediate category of disease recognized by the US Centers for Disease Control and Prevention
 B movie